The Statute of the Autonomous Province of Vojvodina is the highest legal document pertaining to the fundamental principles of Vojvodina, in accordance with the Constitution of Serbia. The Statute was adopted by the Assembly of Vojvodina on 18 October 2008, and later by the National Assembly of Serbia on 30 November 2009.

Statute articles
Article 1. 

Vojvodina is an autonomous province of the citizens who live in it, within the Republic of Serbia.

Vojvodina is a region in which traditional multiculturalism is preserved, and other European principles and values.

AP Vojvodina is an inseparable part of Serbia.

Article 6. National rights:

In Vojvodina, the Serbs, Hungarians, Slovaks, Croats, Montenegrins, Romanians, Roma, Bunjevci, Ruthenians and Macedonians, as well as other numerically smaller national communities that live in it, are equal in exercising their rights.

Among the statute's 70 other articles are guarantees of human rights, minority rights, the use of the minority languages and alphabets, and the banning of capital punishment and human cloning. In official use is the Serbian Language and Cyrillic alphabet and minority languages Hungarian, Slovak, Croatian, Romanian and Ruthenian and their respective alphabets, in accordance with the law and the provincial Assembly decision.

See also
Politics of Vojvodina
Vojvodina Autonomist Movement
Administrative divisions of Serbia

References

External links
Statute of the Autonomous Province of Vojvodina (in Serbian)

Politics of Vojvodina